The 2002 USL Premier Development League season was the 8th PDL season. The season began in April 2002 and ended in August 2002.

Cape Cod Crusaders finished the season as national champions, beating Boulder Rapids Reserve 2-1 in the PDL Championship game. Des Moines Menace finished with the best regular season record in the league, winning 15 out of their 18 games, suffering no losses, and finishing with a +49 goal difference.

Changes from 2001

Name changes 
Boulder Nova became Boulder Rapids Reserve
Lafayette Lightning became Austin Lightning
San Fernando Valley Heroes became Los Angeles Heroes

New franchises 
Twelve teams joined the league this year, including eight brand new franchises:

Promoted 
 The Calgary Storm were promoted to the A-League.
 The New York Freedom and Westchester Flames were promoted to USL Pro Select.

Folding 
Eight teams left the league prior to the beginning of the season:
Colorado Springs Ascent - Colorado Springs, Colorado
Miami Strike Force - Miami, Florida
North Jersey Imperials - Paramus, New Jersey
Okanagan Predators - Kelowna, British Columbia
San Gabriel Valley Highlanders - Glendale, California
Twin Cities Phoenix - Edina, Minnesota
West Dallas Kings - Dallas, Texas
Wichita Jets - Wichita, Kansas

Standings

Central Conference

Great Lakes Division

Heartland Division

Eastern Conference

Mid Atlantic Division

Northeast Division

Southern Conference

Mid South Division

Southeast Division

Western Conference

Northwest Division

Southwest Division

Playoffs

References

2002
4
2002 in Canadian soccer